The men's 100 metre freestyle competition of the swimming events at the 1991 Pan American Games took place on 14 August. The last Pan American Games champion was Todd Dudley of US.

This race consisted of two lengths of the pool, both lengths being in freestyle.

It was the first time that the U.S. lost the gold medal in the men's 100 meter freestyle, after 10 straight titles. This feat fitted Gustavo Borges, who went on to win four Olympic medals after this.

Results
All times are in minutes and seconds.

Heats

Final 
The final was held on August 14.

References

Swimming at the 1991 Pan American Games